You Ain't Woman Enough is the seventh solo studio album by American country music singer-songwriter Loretta Lynn. It was released on September 12, 1966, by Decca Records. It was Lynn's first No. 1 album on the US Billboard Hot Country Albums chart, as well as her first album to chart on the Billboard Top LPs chart.

The album includes five Lynn compositions, one of which was co-written with other songwriters. The album also features cover versions of previous hits by other artists, including Nancy Sinatra's "These Boots Are Made for Walkin'" and Dolly Parton's "Put It Off Until Tomorrow".

Critical reception 

Cashbox published a review in the issue dated September 24, 1966, which said, "With the title tune of this set having recently hit the Number 1 spot on the Country charts, Loretta Lynn should sell heaps of LP’s in a growing country market. The lark offers fans, in addition to the click, top reading of such strong tunes as "These Boots Are Made For Walkin’", "God Gave Me a Heart to Forgive", and "Put It Off Until Tomorrow". Watch this package score sales aplenty in no time at all."

AllMusic gave the album a positive review, calling Lynn's recording of the Wilburn Brothers' hit "It's Another World" an "excellent version" of their song.

Commercial performance 
The album debuted at No. 29 on the US Billboard Hot Country Albums chart dated October 8, 1966. It peaked at No. 1 on the chart dated November 12 and became Lynn's first album to top the chart. The album was also Lynn's first album to appear on the US Billboard Top LP's chart, where it peaked at No. 140 on the chart dated March 25, 1967.

The album's only single, "You Ain't Woman Enough", was released in May 1966 and became Lynn's biggest hit up to that point, peaking at No. 2 on the US Billboard Hot Country Singles chart.

"A Man I Hardly Know" charted in 1967 at No. 72 when it was released as the B-side of "If You're Not Gone Too Long" from Lynn's 1967 album, Singin' with Feelin'.

Recording
Recording of the album took place over three sessions at two studios. The first two sessions on January 13 and March 22, 1966, were held at Columbia Recording Studio in Nashville, Tennessee. The final session for the album was on April 11, 1966, at RCA Victor Studio in Nashville. "You Ain't Woman Enough" was recorded on November 15, 1965, during a session for 1966's I Like 'Em Country, at Columbia Recording Studio.

Track listing

Personnel
Adapted from the Decca recording session records.
Willie Ackerman – drums
Harold Bradley – electric bass guitar
Owen Bradley – producer
David Briggs – piano
Fred Carter – electric guitar
Floyd Cramer – piano
Ray Edenton – acoustic guitar
Lloyd Green – steel guitar
Buddy Harman – drums
Kelso Herston – guitar
Junior Huskey – bass
The Jordanaires – background vocals
Loretta Lynn – lead vocals
Grady Martin – electric guitar
Hal Rugg – steel guitar
Pete Wade – guitar
Joe Zinkan – bass

Charts
Album

Singles

Charted B-sides

References 

1966 albums
Loretta Lynn albums
Albums produced by Owen Bradley
Decca Records albums